Birdston is a hamlet located in East Dunbartonshire, Scotland between Milton of Campsie and Kirkintilloch. The 'Campsie poet' William Muir (1766-1817) was born in Birdston and is buried in the kirkyard there. A monument to him was erected in the kirkyard by admirers of his poems in 1857.

References

Hamlets in East Dunbartonshire